Stayton High School is a public high school in Stayton, Oregon, United States. Formerly known as Stayton Union High School, and established proper in 1921, Stayton High School became a unified school in 1949.

Academics
As of 2018, according to Schooldigger.com, Stayton High ranked 106th out of 283 Oregon high schools, up from 174th in 2016.

Test scores

The percentages of students who met or exceeded the OAKS state tests from the 2012–13 school year are as follows:
 Math - 67.7%
 Reading and Literature - 84.4%
 Science - 68.1%
 Writing - 54.3%

By comparison, the state averages were:
 Math - 68.8%
 Reading and Literature - 84.5%
 Science - 62.9%
 Writing - 59.5%

Graduation

In the 2017–18 school year, 81% of students graduated on time, an increase of 8% from the previous year. By comparison, 70% received a regular high school diploma six years earlier in 2012.

Athletics

Fall
 Cheerleading
 Cross country
 Football
 Soccer
 Volleyball

Winter
 Basketball
 Cheerleading
 Dance
 Swimming
 Wrestling

Spring
 Baseball
 Golf
 Softball
 Tennis
 Track

The school is known for their successful dance team, the Highlights. The team has won a total of 16 state championship titles, winning 12 of those consecutively from 2003–2014.

Notable alumni
 Greg Brock, baseball player
 Fred Girod, dentist and member of the Oregon State Senate

References

High schools in Marion County, Oregon
Public high schools in Oregon
1949 establishments in Oregon
Stayton, Oregon